is a Japanese professional boxer, who has held the WBO super flyweight title since 2022.

Amateur boxing career
Hiruta took up boxing while attending the Okayama Technical High School and continued to train while at the JSDF Physical Training School. Hiruta was able to reach the finals of the 2016 All Japan Women's Championships, competing in the flyweight event, but was defeated by the 2014 World Championships bronze medalist Madoka Wada in the final bout of the tournament. Hiruta participated in the next year's All Japan Women's Championship as well and although she was able to reach the finals for the second consecutive year, she once again suffered a loss at the hands on Madoka Wada.

Hiruta won the gold medal in the flyweight event of the 2018 All Japan Women's Championships and in the featherweight event of the 2019 All Japan Women's Championships. She furthermore competed at the 2018 World Championships, but lost in the opening round of the tournament. Hiruta ended her amateur career with a record of 29–16, with 13 victories coming by way of stoppage.

Professional boxing career

Early career
Hiruta was discharged from the JSDF in March 2021 and acquired her B-class professional boxing license from the Japanese Boxing Commission in May 2021. Hiruta made her professional boxing debut against the undefeated 4–0 Nanae Yamaka on 15 October 2021. She won the fight by unanimous decision, with all three judges awarding her all six rounds of the bout. Hiruta scored the sole knockdown of the fight in the opening round, as she floored her opponent with a right hook.

Hiruta faced the three-time world title challenger Terumi Nuki on 12 April 2022, in what was the first eight-round bout of her career. She won the fight by unanimous decision, with two scorecards of 77–73 and one scorecard of 76–74. Hiruta was awarded rounds one through six, but suffered two knockdowns in the seventh round, which led to her losing the eighth round as well.

Hiruta, who was at the time the top ranked flyweight contender according to the Japanese Boxing Commission, was booked to face the third-ranked contender Hinami Yanai for the vacant Japanese flyweight championship. The title bout was scheduled for the undercard of "Queen's Crest 2022", which took place at the Korakuen Hall in Tokyo, Japan on 1 September 2022. Yanai weighed-in at 52. 1 kg at the official weigh-ins, 1.3 kg above the limit. She failed to make weight in her second attempt as well, coming in at 51.4 kg. This made her ineligible to capture the vacant belt. Hiruta won the fight by unanimous decision, with all three judges scoring the bout 60–54 in her favor. Following this victory, the East Japan Boxing Association awarded her the "New Star" award for the month of September.

WBO super flyweight champion

Hiruta vs. Taniyama
On 2 November 2022, a press conference was held, attended by Hiruta and the Japanese bantamweight champion Kanako Taniyama. At this press conference, it was revealed that the pair would face each other for the vacant WBO junior bantamweight championship. The title bout was scheduled as the main event of Victoriva.7, which took place at the Korakuen Hall in Tokyo, Japan on 1 December 2022 and was broadcast by BOXING RAISE. Hiruta won the fight by a dominant unanimous decision, with two judges scoring the bout 100–89 in her favor, while the third judge awarded her a 99–90 scorecard. On 8 February 2023, she was named the 2022 "Female Fighter of the Year" by a Japanese media members vote.

Professional boxing record

See also
 List of current female world boxing champions
 List of WBO female world champions

References

Living people
1996 births
21st-century Japanese people
Japanese women boxers
Sportspeople from Okayama
World Boxing Organization champions
World super-flyweight boxing champions
Flyweight boxers
Super-flyweight boxers